Forever Love may refer to:

Songs
"Forever Love" (Alisa Mizuki song), 1997
"Forever Love" (Ami Suzuki song), 2004
"Forever Love" (Color Me Badd song), 1992
"Forever Love" (Cute song), 2008
"Forever Love" (Gary Barlow song), 1996
"Forever Love" (Reba McEntire song), 1998
"Forever Love" (TVXQ song), 2007
"Forever Love" (X Japan song), 1996
"Forever Love", by Taio Cruz from Rokstarr, 2009

Films
Forever Love (1998 film), an American television film directed by Michael Switzer
Forever Love (2013 film), a Taiwanese film directed by Kitamura Toyoharu and Shao Li-shiou
Forever Love (2014 film), a Chinese film directed by Zhao Yiran and Wei Jie
Forever Love (2015 film), a Chinese film directed by An Zhanjun
Backstreet Dreams (film), a 1990 American film released in the Philippines as Forever Love
The Color of Time, a 2012 film released in the UK as Forever Love